Pyramid City is a ghost town located south of Sutcliffe, Nevada.  This location was also sometimes known as Pyramid and should not be confused with Pyramid, Nevada, located north of Sutcliffe.  Pyramid City consisted of two mining camps, Upper Pyramid (also knows as Jonesville) and Lower Pyramid, also known as Pyramid City.

History
Although silver veins had been discovered as early as 1860 in the area, the Pyramid district did not attract any significant attention until the spring of 1876, when an interesting ore-specimen was noticed by a Reno physician. The physician was assisting an ill miner when the doctor noticed the specimen on the man's table. Assaying the mineral resulted in a strong prediction of excellent returns. A silver rush followed after news of the discovery had spread to other mining camps. Pyramid City sprang from up from this desert area and a two—stamp mill was built to crush silver ore.  In the summer of 1876, the population of Pyramid City was nearly 300.

Of the five townships that were established in the district, Pyramid City became the most important. In March 1877, the city had two saloons, a Chinese washhouse, store, boarding house and a stage line with daily service to Reno. By the winter of 1877, sixty miners were working the area, with only one woman living in the camp. Pyramid City became vacant toward the end of the 1880s and the Pyramid City post office closed in 1889. No structures remain standing in the former township

Pyramid City had a Post Office from February 1879 until October 1879 and from April 1880 until February 1889.

See also
 List of ghost towns in Nevada

References

Ghost towns in Washoe County, Nevada